Gourevitch is a surname. Notable people with the surname include:
Boris Gourevitch (1889-1964), author, pacifist 
Danielle Gourevitch (born 1941), French medical historian and classicist
Peter Gourevitch (born 1943), American political scientist
Philip Gourevitch (born 1961), American author and journalist
Raissa Gourevitch (born 1984), Russian tennis player